Wesker is a surname. Notable people with the surname include:

Arnold Wesker (1932–2016), English playwright
Sarah Wesker (1901–1971), English trade unionist

Fictional characters
Albert Wesker, a character in the video game series Resident Evil
Alex Wesker, sister of Albert, a character in the video game series Resident Evil
Arnold Wesker, the real name of the Ventriloquist, a Batman villain